Turbonilla canquei is a species of sea snail, a marine gastropod mollusk in the family Pyramidellidae, the pyrams and their allies.

Distribution
This species occurs in the Atlantic Ocean off West Africa (Libreville, Gabon)

References

External links
 To Encyclopedia of Life
 To World Register of Marine Species

Endemic fauna of Gabon
canquei
Gastropods described in 1912